Jacqueline Zebisch (born 18 June 1984), known professionally as Ella Endlich, is a German singer who also performed as Junia as a teenager. Best known for her song "Küss mich, halt mich, lieb mich", which is based on the title song of the film Tři oříšky pro Popelku, she participated in the national final for the Eurovision Song Contest 2016.

Career

1984–2009: Early life and career beginnings 

Ella Endlich was born in Weimar. She is the daughter of songwriter and record producer Norbert Endlich. In 1989, she moved with her family to West Berlin. At age 10, she sang for the first time in a recording studio at the Hansa Tonstudios and was hired as a background vocalist for the ZDF-Hitparade. During her schooldays, she took dancing and singing lessons and also filmed various videos with her own choreographies for the television channel VIVA in Los Angeles, Miami, and London.

She signed her first contract with Columbia Records on 18 June 1998, her fourteenth birthday, which inspired her stage name at the time, Junia. Her début single "It's Funny" was released in 1999 and peaked at 17 in Germany and 21 in Switzerland. Its follow-up "My Guy" peaked at 54 in Germany and her third single "Who's the Other Woman" peaked at 72 in the country, while her fourth single "Skaterboy", released in 2000, did not chart. All of these songs appeared on her début album Junia, released in 2000.

In 2000, during her teenage career, she took an apprenticeship in the field musical theater at the Musicalstudio Neukölln and finished the Realschule to study at the Bayrischen Theaterakademie August in Munich in October 2001. She specialised in drama and was also educated in dancing, musical, and singing. In 2001 and 2002, she was part of the ensemble of the Bregenzer Festspielproduktionen that performed La Bohème and West Side Story. She performed at the Prinzregentheater München and the Theater Erfurt in City of Angels. In 2005, she completed her studies at the Bayrische Theaterakademie with a diploma. In 2006, she won the singing contest of the HypoVereinsbank as well as the audience prize.

From 2005 to 2009, she performed in numerous musicals, such as Heidi (as Tinette), Sweet Charity (as Betzy), Grease (as Sandy), Prinzessin Lillifee und der Zauber der Rose (as Princess Lillifee), Best of Musicals (as Christine from The Phantom of the Opera), Moulin Rouge! (as Satine), The Little Mermaid (as Ariel), Wicked (as Elphaba), or Les Misérables (as Cosette). She also had a role in the play Der Steppenwolf, which is based on a Hermann Hesse work.

2009–present: Career as Ella Endlich 
Her first release under the name Ella Endlich was the single "Küss mich, halt mich, lieb mich", which peaked at 12 on the German charts and reached gold status. The song is based on the title song of the film Tři oříšky pro Popelku. In October 2010, she released her first album as Ella Endlich, Da (English: "Here"), which peaked at 53 in Germany and 66 in Austria. Its follow-up Meilenweit (English: "Miles and Miles"), released exactly a year later, peaked at 94 in Germany. In 2012, Endlich released an EP titled Wintercollage. Her album Die süße Wahrheit (English: "The Sweet Truth") was released in June 2014. Later that year, she switched record labels, management, and producers.

In February 2016, Endlich released the album Träume auf Asphalt (English: "Dreams on Asphalt") through Universal and participated in the national final for the Eurovision Song Contest 2016 with the song "Adrenalin". She was a judge on the fifteenth season of Deutschland sucht den Superstar (the German version of Pop Idol and American Idol), which aired from 3 January to 5 May 2018, alongside Dieter Bohlen, Mousse T., and Carolin Niemczyk.

Discography

Studio albums

As Junia 
 2000: Junia

As Ella Endlich 
 2010: Da
 2011: Meilenweit
 2012: Wintercollage (Teldec, 5053105521326)
 2014: Die süße Wahrheit
 2016: Träume auf Asphalt
 2018: Im Vertrauen
 2021: Endlich Weihnachten (with Norbert Endlich)

References

External links 

Ella Endlich's official website

1984 births
Living people
Musicians from Weimar
People from Bezirk Erfurt
German pop singers
Deutschland sucht den Superstar judges
21st-century German women singers
Masked Singer winners